Jalen Alexander Hurts (born August 7, 1998) is an American football quarterback for the Philadelphia Eagles of the National Football League (NFL). He played his first three seasons of college football at the University of Alabama, where he was a member of the team that won the 2018 College Football Playoff National Championship, and used his final year of eligibility at the University of Oklahoma. Selected by the Eagles in the second round of the 2020 NFL Draft, he became their starter near the end of his rookie season. Hurts had a breakout season in 2022 when he led the Eagles to an appearance in Super Bowl LVII.

High school career
Hurts attended Channelview High School in Channelview, Texas. Hurts's father, Averion, was the football coach at Channelview High School throughout his son's high school career. As a senior, he passed for 2,384 yards with 26 touchdown passes and rushed for 1,391 yards and 25 touchdowns. Hurts was a second-team all-district selection as a sophomore and was named the District 21-6A Overall MVP as a junior during his high school playing years. Throughout his high school career Hurts was rated as a four-star recruit and was ranked among the top dual-threat quarterbacks in the Class of 2016. Although Texas A&M made a strong push to recruit Hurts, Hurts committed to the University of Alabama on June 5, 2015. He was recruited by Alabama's defensive line coach Bo Davis and offensive coordinator Lane Kiffin.

In addition to football, Hurts participated in powerlifting. As a sophomore in high school, Hurts was squatting 500 pounds of weight and would eventually become regional finalist in the 198-pound weight class.

College career

Alabama

Freshman season

As a true freshman for the Alabama Crimson Tide football team in 2016, Hurts competed to open the season as the starting quarterback. Blake Barnett started the first game against the USC Trojans, but by the second game, Hurts had taken over the starting role, becoming the first true freshman to start at quarterback for Alabama in 32 years (Vince Sutton in 1984 was the last).

Hurts produced a historic freshman season under head coach Nick Saban. He threw for 2,780 yards and 23 touchdowns with nine interceptions. His completion percentage was at 62.8 percent, and he finished the season with a quarterback rating of 139.12. He rushed for a total of 954 yards and 13 touchdowns, breaking the school single-season record for rushing yards by a quarterback, surpassing Steadman Shealy's previous record of 791 yards. He finished the 2016 season with 36 overall touchdowns breaking the previous record for touchdowns in a single season for the Crimson Tide (35) set by Blake Sims in 2014. Hurts became the first quarterback coached by Nick Saban to rush for more than 11 touchdowns in a single season. He was the first player in Alabama history to pass for 300 yards and rush for 100 yards in the same game and the first quarterback to rush for 120 yards or more in multiple games.

In the Iron Bowl game against Auburn, Hurts completed 75% of his passes, which set a new Iron Bowl record. Alabama concluded its 2016–2017 regular season with a perfect 12–0 (8–0 SEC) record. On November 30, 2016, Hurts was declared one of the ten finalists for the Manning Award, which is given to the nation's top college quarterback. On December 3, 2016, he led his team to win the 2016 SEC Championship over the Florida Gators and was subsequently named SEC Offensive Player of the Year, SEC Freshman of the Year, and received Freshman All-American from several publications. Hurts was featured on the cover page of Sports Illustrated College Football Playoff magazine on December 6, 2016. On January 9, 2017, top-seeded Alabama lost the 2017 College Football Playoff National Championship against the Clemson Tigers by a score of 35–31. The bowl game was played at Raymond James Stadium in Tampa.

Sophomore season

In 2017, Hurts led the Tide to an 11–1 regular season record, losing 26–14 to Auburn in the regular season finale. The Tide still qualified for the College Football Playoff as the #4 seed, where they played Clemson in the 2018 Sugar Bowl semifinal. Hurts was the offensive MVP in that game, with Daron Payne being the defensive MVP in a 24–6 win over the Tigers.
Going up against the Georgia Bulldogs in the 2018 College Football Playoff National Championship, Alabama fell behind 13–0 at halftime, and Hurts was benched in favor of true freshman Tua Tagovailoa. Tagovailoa led the Crimson Tide to a come-from-behind 26–23 victory in overtime.
Hurts finished the 2017 season with 2,081 passing yards, 17 passing touchdowns, and one interception to go along with 855 rushing yards and eight rushing touchdowns.

Junior season

After Tagovailoa led the Crimson Tide to victory in the National Championship the year before, questions arose if Hurts would remain the starting quarterback for Alabama. In the season opener against Louisville, Tagovailoa was the starter. Hurts came into the game in a rotation. He had 70 passing yards in the 51–14 victory. Tagovailoa was officially named the starter going into the next game against Arkansas State. In a backup role, Hurts earned significant playing time in the 2018 season.

In the 2018 SEC Championship Game, he relieved an injured Tagovailoa and led the team to a comeback victory against Georgia. Alabama moved to 13–0 and secured a spot in the Playoff.

Hurts completed his B.A. in communication and information sciences in December 2018.

Oklahoma

Senior season

On January 16, 2019, Hurts announced via social media that he would be transferring to the University of Oklahoma for his final year of eligibility. As a graduate transfer, he was eligible to play for the 2019 season.

In his first game as a Sooner on September 1, 2019, Hurts shattered Oklahoma's single-game yardage record in a debut (previously held by Baker Mayfield when he put up 396 yards of total offense against Akron in 2015), putting up 508 yards of total offense against Houston. On September 28, in a 55–14 victory over Texas Tech, he had 415 passing yards, three passing touchdowns, and one interception to go along with nine carries for 70 rushing yards and a rushing touchdown. Hurts helped lead Oklahoma to a 7–0 start to the season. The team's first setback came against Kansas State on October 26. In the 48–41 loss, Hurts passed for 395 yards and a passing touchdown to go along with 19 carries for 96 rushing yards and three rushing touchdowns.

Hurts helped lead Oklahoma to a Big 12 Championship and a spot in the College Football Playoff. The Sooners' season ended with a 63–28 loss to LSU in the 2019 Peach Bowl. Hurts recorded a successful season with the Sooners, recording 3,851 passing yards, 32 passing touchdowns, and eight interceptions to go along with 1,298 rushing yards and 20 rushing touchdowns. He finished second in the Heisman Trophy voting to Joe Burrow.

Statistics

Professional career

2020 season

The Philadelphia Eagles selected Hurts 53rd overall in the second round of the 2020 NFL Draft. After originally being named the third-string quarterback behind Nate Sudfeld, he gained the backup position at Week 2, mainly so he could be used for quarterback runs or as a decoy.

On December 6, 2020, Hurts relieved Carson Wentz, who was benched due to ineffective play, against the Green Bay Packers. In this Week 13 matchup, Hurts threw his career first passing touchdown to Greg Ward and finished with 109 passing yards with a touchdown and an interception in the 30–16 loss. On December 8, 2020, Hurts was named the starter for their Week 14 game against the New Orleans Saints. In his first NFL start, Hurts completed 17 of 30 passing attempts for 167 passing yards and one touchdown, leading the Eagles to a 24–21 win. Hurts also added 106 rushing yards, totaling 273 all purpose yards. On December 20, 2020, in Week 15 against the Arizona Cardinals, Hurts finished with 338 passing yards, three passing touchdowns, 63 rushing yards and one rushing touchdown in the 33–26 loss.
In Week 16 against the Dallas Cowboys, Hurts threw for 342 yards, one touchdown, two interceptions, and rushed for 69 yards during the 37–17 loss.

In Week 17 against the Washington Football Team on Sunday Night Football, Hurts threw for 72 yards and an interception and rushed for 34 yards and two touchdowns before being benched in favor of Sudfeld during the 20–14 loss. Hurts' benching drew allegations of Eagles head coach Doug Pederson attempting to deliberately lose the game; Pederson was fired shortly afterwards.

2021 season

Before the start of the regular season, Hurts switched his jersey number to No. 1, which had become available with the departure of punter Cameron Johnston. On August 31, 2021, Hurts was named the starter for the regular season by new head coach Nick Sirianni.

In the season opener against the Atlanta Falcons, Hurts led the Eagles to a 32–6 victory, throwing for three touchdowns and a passer rating of 126.4. During a Week 12 loss to the New York Giants, Hurts suffered an ankle injury which kept him out for the following week's game against the New York Jets. The Eagles won that game 33–18 led by backup quarterback Gardner Minshew. Hurts returned after the bye week in a Week 15 matchup against Washington en route to a 27–17 victory.

Hurts helped lead the Eagles to a playoff berth after defeating the Washington Football Team 20–16 in Week 17 and with wins from the San Francisco 49ers and Green Bay Packers later that day. On December 23, 2021, Hurts was named a 2021 Pro Bowl NFC alternate. In the 2021 season, Hurts finished with 3,144 passing yards, 16 passing touchdowns, and nine interceptions to go along with 139 carries for 784 rushing yards and ten rushing touchdowns. He led all quarterbacks in rushing yards and rushing touchdowns in the 2021 season.

In the Wild Card Round against the Tampa Bay Buccaneers, Hurts threw for 258 yards and a touchdown, but fumbled once and threw two interceptions in the 31–15 loss.

2022 season

Hurts completed 22 of his 35 pass attempts for 340 yards and three touchdowns in a 24–8 victory to improve to 3–0 on the season. For his performance, Hurts was named NFC Offensive Player of Month for September, becoming the first Eagles player to win the award since 2017. After a 29–17 victory over the Houston Texans, Hurts became the first Eagles quarterback to lead the team to an 8–0 record.

In Week 12, Hurts rushed for 157 yards and threw for 153 yards and two touchdowns in a 40–33 win over the Packers, earning NFC Offensive Player of the Week. He became the first player with 150+ rushing yards, 150+ passing yards and multiple passing touchdowns in a single game. In Week 13, Hurts threw 380 pass yards and four total touchdowns (three passing, one rushing) against the Tennessee Titans, becoming the first Eagles player with at least 350 pass yards, three passing touchdowns, and a rushing touchdown in the same game.

With a Week 14 win over the New York Giants, Hurts led the Eagles to a consecutive playoff berth. A day after the win over the Chicago Bears, it was revealed that Hurts sprained his throwing shoulder, ruling him out for the Eagles' Week 16 game against the Dallas Cowboys. Despite his injury, Hurts would help lead the Eagles to a 22–16 victory over the Giants in Week 18.

Hurts finished the season with a starting record of 14–1, tying a franchise-best (with Randall Cunningham) 35 total touchdowns (22 passing, 13 rushing) to just six interceptions, 3,701 passing yards, and a 101.5 quarterback rating. As a result of his play in the 2022 season, Hurts was named to his first career Pro Bowl, and was a Second Team All-Pro. On January 25, 2023, Hurts was named as one of the five finalists for the NFL Most Valuable Player Award.

On January 21, 2023, Hurts led the Eagles to a 38–7 victory over the New York Giants in the Divisional Round of the 2022–23 NFL playoffs. In doing so, Hurts won his first playoff game, and later led the Eagles to a 31–7 win in the NFC Championship against the San Francisco 49ers to advance to Super Bowl LVII and face the Kansas City Chiefs. In the game, Hurts threw for 304 yards and a touchdown, and rushed for 70 yards and scored 3 rushing touchdowns, the most rushing yards and rushing touchdowns by a quarterback in Super Bowl history. His three touchdowns and a two-point conversion also tied the record for most points scored in a Super Bowl with 20. However, Hurts also lost a fumble which was returned for a touchdown by Nick Bolton in the second quarter, and attempted a Hail Mary pass on the last play of the game which fell short as the Eagles lost to the Chiefs, 38–35.

NFL career statistics

Regular season

Postseason

Personal life
Hurts' parents are Pamela and Averion Hurts. Hurts has two siblings: a younger sister, Kynnedy, and an older brother, Averion, named after their father. Jalen's brother, Averion, was the starting quarterback for Texas Southern University and is now a college football coach at the University of Alabama. As of Hurts' freshman year, one of his parents attended his football game every week, while the other attended Averion's game.

Hurts is a Christian. He has said, “I keep God at the center of everything. I give Him all the praise, I lean on Him all the time. And I know that everything unfolds the way it’s supposed to.”

On June 20, 2022, Hurts filed for a trademark for the phrase "HURTS SO GOOD."  The trademark registry says that it will be used for a clothing line that includes "men's, women's and children's clothing, namely shirts, jackets, sweatshirts, pants, shorts, vests, gloves, socks, sweaters, underwear, skirts, hats and belts."

Jalen Hurts is an advocate for women in sports and employs an all-female management team, including his social media, marketing, communications, and sports agent team members. In 2021, Hurts honored female empowerment and women in sports when participating in the NFL's "My Cause, My Cleats" initiative.

In 2022, Hurts provided vocals on the Christmas album A Philly Special Christmas.

References

External links

Philadelphia Eagles bio
Oklahoma Sooners bio
Alabama Crimson Tide bio

1998 births
Living people
African-American players of American football
American football quarterbacks
Alabama Crimson Tide football players
Oklahoma Sooners football players
Philadelphia Eagles players
Players of American football from Texas
Sportspeople from Harris County, Texas
National Conference Pro Bowl players